2006 in sports describes the year's events in world sport.

American football
 Super Bowl XL – the Pittsburgh Steelers (AFC) won 21–10 over the Seattle Seahawks (NFC)
Location: Ford Field
Attendance: 68,206
MVP: Hines Ward, WR (Pittsburgh)
 Rose Bowl (2005 season):
 The Texas Longhorns won 41–38 over the Southern California Trojans to win the BCS National Championship
 March 14 - former San Diego Chargers quarterback Drew Brees signs a 6-year, $60 million deal with the New Orleans Saints after the Miami Dolphins were suggested by medical staff to not sign Brees due to a career-threatening shoulder injury he suffered at the end of the 2005 season. After Brees had immediate success and broke several records in New Orleans, this signing is believed by many as the greatest free agency signing in NFL history, tied with the Denver Broncos’ signing of Peyton Manning in 2012.
 August 19 - Barrow High School played the first organized football game in the Arctic against Delta Junction High School.
 MVP of Super Bowl XL is Pittsburgh Steelers wide receiver Hines Ward.
 Reggie White, Troy Aikman, John Madden, Warren Moon, Harry Carson, and Rayfield Wright are elected to the Pro Football Hall of Fame.

Association football

 January 1 – Australia officially leaves the Oceania Football Confederation and joins the Asian Football Confederation
International competitions
 2006 African Cup of Nations – Egypt
 2006 FIFA World Cup – Italy
 2006 FIFA Club World Cup – Sport Club Internacional
 Copa Libertadores 2006 – Sport Club Internacional
 UEFA Champions League 2005-06 – FC Barcelona
Domestic competitions
 Argentina Primera División – Boca Juniors (Clausura)
 Brazil Campeonato Brasileiro – São Paulo FC
 England Premiership – Chelsea
 France Ligue 1 – Lyon
 Germany Bundesliga – Bayern Munich
 Italy Serie A – Inter Milan awarded title after initial winners Juventus were stripped of the title due to involvement in the 2006 Serie A match fixing scandal.
 Spain La Liga – FC Barcelona
 Portugal Liga – FC Porto

Athletics

 March – 2006 Commonwealth Games held in Melbourne
 May 12 – Justin Gatlin equals Asafa Powell's 100 m world record time of 9.77 seconds in Doha, Qatar. Gatlin was initially given a time of 9.76, which would have been a new record, but a few days later the time was corrected to 9.77
 June 11 – Asafa Powell equals the 100 m world record once again, as he ran the distance in 9.77 seconds at Gateshead, England
 August 18 – Asafa Powell runs the 100 m in a record-equalling 9.77 seconds for a third time, this time in Zürich
 August – 2006 European Championships in Athletics held in Gothenburg, Swedeno

Baseball

 March 20 –  Japan wins the first World Baseball Classic, defeating Cuba 10–6 in the championship game.
 May 28 – Barry Bonds hits his 715th career home run in a 6–3 home loss to the Colorado Rockies, passing Babe Ruth for second place on the career list and setting a new record for left-handed hitters.
 July 11 – American League wins the MLB All–Star Game by a score of 3–2 on Michael Young's game-winning 2-run triple in the 9th inning.
 October 14 – Detroit Tigers sweep the Oakland Athletics in the American League Championship Series and advance to their first World Series since 1984.
 October 27 – St. Louis Cardinals win the 2006 World Series 4–1 in Game 5. The St. Louis Cardinals (10 wins) advance to 2nd place for most World Series wins after the New York Yankees (27).

Basketball

 Miami Heat defeat the Dallas Mavericks in 6 games in the NBA Finals series for Miami's first-ever NBA World Championship. Finals MVP Dwyane Wade rallied four consecutive 35-point games to come back from a two games to none deficit and win four straight.
 University of Florida wins its first ever NCAA title, defeating UCLA 73–57. George Mason, an 11 seed, makes it to the final four
 University of Maryland wins its first ever NCAA women's title, defeating Duke 77–75 in overtime.
 January 22 – Los Angeles Lakers star Kobe Bryant scores 81 points in a win over the Toronto Raptors, becoming only the second player in league history to score at least 80 points in one game. It was the second highest individual point total in NBA history (Second only to Wilt Chamberlain's 100 point performance).
 Chinese Basketball Association – Guangdong Southern Tigers defeat Bayi Rockets (4–1) in finals.
 National Basketball League (Australia) – Melbourne Tigers defeat the Sydney Kings 3–0 in best-of-five final series
 Euroleague – Russian power CSKA Moscow dethrones the two-time defending Euroleague champions Maccabi Tel Aviv (Israel) 73–69 at Sazka Arena in Prague. This is CSKA's fifth title in the competition, but first since 1971. Third place goes to TAU Cerámica, which defeated FC Barcelona 87–82 in an all-Spanish affair.
 The Detroit Shock stunned the 2005 WNBA Champion Sacramento Monarchs in 5 games in the 2006 WNBA Finals.

Bowling
 February 19 - Tommy Jones wins the 63rd U.S. Open
 March 26 - Walter Ray Williams, Jr. wins the Denny's PBA World Championship
 April 9 - Chris Barnes wins the Dexter Tournament of Champions
 Tommy Jones is named the Chris Schenkel PBA Player of the Year
 October 29 - Doug Kent wins the USBC Masters

Boxing
 January 7 – Carlos Manuel Baldomir upsets Zab Judah by unanimous decision and is crowned world welterweight champion by the WBC.
 March 3 – Welshman Joe Calzaghe defeats American Jeff Lacy by landslide unanimous decision for the WBO-IBF super middleweight title unification. Calzaghe's stellar performance propelled him to #9 in Ring Magazine's pound for pound list.
 April 1 – Sergei Liakhovich wins the WBO world heavyweight title from Lamon Brewster by unanimous decision.
 April 8 – Floyd Mayweather Jr. defeats Zab Judah by unanimous decision to win the IBF welterweight title. A mini-riot ensued as Roger Mayweather, Floyd's uncle and trainer, runs into the ring retaliating to a low blow and rabbit punch by Judah. The fight resumed and Mayweather won by decision.
 April 22 – Wladimir Klitschko wins the IBF world heavyweight title from Chris Byrd by TKO in round 7.
 June 10 – Bernard Hopkins defeats Antonio Tarver by unanimous to take the light heavyweight world championship.
 June 17 – Winky Wright and Jermain Taylor fight ends in a draw for the undisputed middleweight championship of the world in Memphis, Tennessee
 13 to July 23 – 36th European Amateur Boxing Championships held in Plovdiv, Bulgaria
 August 12 – Oleg Maskaev knocks out Hasim Rahman in the 12th round to win the WBC Heavyweight title.
 November 4 Floyd Mayweather Jr. becomes the WBC and linear Welterweight champion after he defeats Carlos Baldomir by unanimous decision.
 November 11 Wladimir Klitschko defends his IBF heavyweight title by defeating American contender Calvin Brock winning by a stunning knockout in the seventh round.
 November 18  Manny Pacquiao wins by technical knockout in his third and rubber match against Erik Morales
 December 9 Jermain Taylor defends his middleweight title as he defeats Kassim Ouma

Canadian football
November 19 – The BC Lions win the 94th Grey Cup game, defeating the Montreal Alouettes 25–14 at Canad Inns Stadium in Winnipeg.

Cricket

Curling
 Olympic champions:
 Men's – Canada (Brad Gushue, Mark Nichols, Russ Howard, Jamie Korab, Mike Adam)
 Women's – Sweden (Anette Norberg, Eva Lund, Cathrine Lindahl, Anna Svärd, Ulrika Bergman)
 World champions:
 Men's – Scotland (David Murdoch, Ewan MacDonald, Warwick Smith, Euan Byers, Peter Smith)
 Women's – Sweden (Anette Norberg, Eva Lund, Cathrine Lindahl, Anna Svärd, Ulrika Bergman)

Cycling
 2006 Tour de France was won by Floyd Landis of the US, who subsequently failed a drugs test
 2006 UCI Cyclo-cross World Championships held in Zeddam, Netherlands, and won by Erwin Vervecken (men) and Marianne Vos (women)
 2006 Giro d'Italia is won by Ivan Basso.
 2006 Vuelta a España is won by Alexander Vinokourov.

Figure skating
 World Figure Skating Championships held in Calgary, Alberta, Canada
 Men's champion: Stéphane Lambiel
 Ladies' champion: Kimmie Meissner
 Pair skating champions: Pang Qing and Tong Jian
 Ice dancing champions: Albena Denkova and Maxim Staviski

Floorball
 Men's World Floorball Championships
 Champion: Sweden
 Women's under-19 World Floorball Championships
 Champion: Sweden
 European Cup
 Men's champion: Warberg IC
 Women's champion: IKSU Innebandy

Gaelic Athletic Association
 Gaelic football
 All–Ireland Senior Football Championship, Kerry 4–15 Mayo 3-05
 National Football League, Kerry 2–11 Galway 0–11
 Hurling
 All–Ireland Senior Hurling Championship, Kilkenny 1–16 Cork 1–13

Gliding
 World Gliding Championships held at Eskilstuna, Sweden
 Open Class Winner: Michael Sommer, Germany; Glider: Alexander Schleicher ASW 22 BLE

Golf
Men's professional
 Masters Tournament – Phil Mickelson
 U.S. Open – Geoff Ogilvy
 British Open – Tiger Woods
 PGA Championship – Tiger Woods
 PGA Tour money leader – Tiger Woods with $9,941,563
Men's amateur
 British Amateur – Julien Guerrier
 U.S. Amateur – Richie Ramsay
 European Amateur – Rory McIlroy
Women's professional
 Kraft Nabisco Championship – Karrie Webb
 LPGA Championship – Se Ri Pak
 U.S. Women's Open – Annika Sörenstam
 Women's British Open – Sherri Steinhauer
 LPGA Tour money leader – Lorena Ochoa with $2,592,872
Team event
 Team Europe wins the Ryder Cup for the third straight time, defeating Team USA 18½–9½.

Handball
 2006 European Men's Handball Championship: France
 2006 European Women's Handball Championship: Norway

Horse racing
Steeplechases
 Cheltenham Gold Cup – War of Attrition
 Grand National – Numbersixvalverde
Flat races
 Australia – Melbourne Cup won by Delta Blues
 Canadian Triple Crown:
 Queen's Plate – Edenwold
 Prince of Wales Stakes – Shillelagh Slew
 Breeders' Stakes – Royal Challenger
 Dubai – Dubai World Cup won by Electrocutionist
 France – Prix de l'Arc de Triomphe won by Rail Link
 Ireland – Irish Derby won by Dylan Thomas
 Japan – Japan Cup won by Deep Impact
 English Triple Crown:
 2,000 Guineas Stakes – George Washington
 The Derby – Sir Percy
 St. Leger Stakes – Sixties Icon
 United States Triple Crown:
 Kentucky Derby – Barbaro
 Preakness Stakes – Bernardini. Barbaro suffered a breakdown during the race and died from complications of the injury in January 2007.
 Belmont Stakes – Jazil
 Breeders' Cup World Thoroughbred Championships:
 Breeders' Cup Classic – Invasor
 Breeders' Cup Distaff – Round Pond
 Breeders' Cup Filly & Mare Turf – Ouija Board
 Breeders' Cup Juvenile – Street Sense
 Breeders' Cup Juvenile Fillies – Dreaming of Anna
 Breeders' Cup Mile – Miesque's Approval
 Breeders' Cup Sprint – Thor's Echo
 Breeders' Cup Turf – Red Rocks

Ice hockey
 February 17 – Swedish women's ice hockey team defeats the United States in the semi-final round in the 2006 Olympic games. This marks the first time that either the United States or Canada has lost to anyone other than each other.
 February 26 – Sweden defeats Finland 3–2 to capture the men's gold medal at the 2006 Olympic games.
 April 8 – Wisconsin Badgers defeat the Boston College Eagles for the NCAA National Championship.
 Stanley Cup Finals – Carolina Hurricanes defeat the Edmonton Oilers 4 games to 3 to win the Stanley Cup

Lacrosse
 World Lacrosse Championship – Canada 15–10 USA in London, Ontario, breaking a 28-year US winning streak.
 National Lacrosse League – Champion's Cup won by Colorado Mammoth over Buffalo Bandits 16–9 at the HSBC Arena, Buffalo, New York
 Major League Lacrosse – Steinfeld Cup won by Philadelphia Barrage over Denver Outlaws 23–12 at The Home Depot Center, Carson, California

Mixed martial arts
The following is a list of major noteworthy MMA events during 2006 in chronological order.

|-
|align=center style="border-style: none none solid solid; background: #e3e3e3"|Date
|align=center style="border-style: none none solid solid; background: #e3e3e3"|Event
|align=center style="border-style: none none solid solid; background: #e3e3e3"|Alternate Name/s
|align=center style="border-style: none none solid solid; background: #e3e3e3"|Location
|align=center style="border-style: none none solid solid; background: #e3e3e3"|Attendance
|align=center style="border-style: none none solid solid; background: #e3e3e3"|PPV Buyrate
|align=center style="border-style: none none solid solid; background: #e3e3e3"|Notes
|-align=center
|January 16
|UFC Ultimate Fight Night 3
|Ultimate Fight Night 3
| Las Vegas, Nevada, USA
|1,008
|
|
|-align=center
|February 4
|UFC 57: Liddell vs. Couture 3
|
| Las Vegas, Nevada, USA
|11,000
|400,000
|
|-align=center
|February 4
|Cage Rage 15: Adrenalin Rush
|
| London, England
|
|
|
|-align=center
|February 26
|Pride 31: Unbreakable
|Pride 31: Dreamers
| Saitama, Japan
|
|
|
|-align=center
|March 4
|UFC 58: USA vs Canada
|
| Las Vegas, Nevada, USA
|9,569
|300,000
|
|-align=center
|March 10
|Strikeforce: Shamrock vs. Gracie
|
| San Jose, California, USA
|18,265
|
|
|-align=center
|March 15
|K-1 Hero's 4
|
| Tokyo, Japan
|
|
|
|-align=center
|April 2
|Pride Bushido 10
|
| Tokyo, Japan
|
|
|
|-align=center
|April 6
|UFC Ultimate Fight Night 4
|Ultimate Fight Night 4
| Las Vegas, Nevada, USA
|843
|
|
|-align=center
|April 15
|UFC 59: Reality Check
|
| Anaheim, California, USA
|13,814
|425,000
|
|-align=center
|April 22
|Cage Rage 16: Critical Condition
|
| London, England
|
|
|
|-align=center
|April 29
|IFL: Legends Championship 2006
|
| Atlantic City, New Jersey, USA
|
|
|
|-align=center
|May 3
|K-1 Hero's 5
|
| Tokyo, Japan
|
|
|
|-align=center
|May 5
|Pride Total Elimination Absolute
|
| Osaka, Japan
|
|
|
|-align=center
|May 27
|UFC 60: Hughes vs. Gracie
|
| Los Angeles, California, USA
|14,765
|620,000
|
|-align=center
|June 3
|IFL: Championship 2006
|
| Atlantic City, New Jersey, USA
|
|
|
|-align=center
|June 4
|Pride Bushido Survival 2006
|Pride Bushido 11  Pride Bushido Survival
| Saitama, Japan
|
|
|
|-align=center
|June 9
|Strikeforce: Revenge
|
| San Jose, California, USA
|10,374
|
|
|-align=center
|June 24
|The Ultimate Fighter 3 Finale
|
| Las Vegas, Nevada, USA
|
|
|
|-align=center
|June 28
|UFC Ultimate Fight Night 5
|Ultimate Fight Night 5
| Las Vegas, Nevada, USA
|606
|
|
|-align=center
|July 1
|Pride Critical Countdown Absolute
|
| Saitama, Japan
|
|
|
|-align=center
|July 1
|Cage Rage 17: Ultimate Challenge
|
| London, England
|
|
|
|-align=center
|July 8
|UFC 61: Bitter Rivals
|
| Las Vegas, Nevada, USA
|11,167
|775,000
|
|-align=center
|July 22
|WFA: King of the Streets
|
| Los Angeles, California, USA
|
|
|
|-align=center
|August 5
|K-1 Hero's 6
|
| Tokyo, Japan
|
|
|
|-align=center
|August 17
|UFC Fight Night 6
|
| Las Vegas, Nevada, USA
|
|
|
|-align=center
|August 26
|UFC 62: Liddell vs. Sobral
|
| Las Vegas, Nevada, USA
|9,859
|500,000
|
|-align=center
|August 26
|Pride Bushido 12
|Pride Bushido Survival 2nd Round
| Nagoya, Japan
|
|
|
|-align=center
|September 9
|IFL: Portland
|
| Portland, Oregon, USA
|
|
|
|-align=center
|September 10
|Pride Final Conflict Absolute
|
| Saitama, Japan
|
|
|
|-align=center
|September 23
|IFL: Gracie vs. Miletich
|
| Moline, Illinois, USA
|
|
|
|-align=center
|September 23
|UFC 63: Hughes vs. Penn
|
| Anaheim, California, USA
|12,604
|400,000
|
|-align=center
|September 30
|Cage Rage 18: Battleground
|
| London, England
|
|
|
|-align=center
|October 7
|Strikeforce: Tank vs. Buentello
|
| Fresno, California, USA
|4,437
|
|
|-align=center
|October 9
|K-1 Hero's 7
|
| Yokohama, Japan
|
|
|
|-align=center
|October 10
|Ortiz vs. Shamrock 3: The Final Chapter
|UFC Fight Night 6.5
| Hollywood, Florida, USA
|3,510
|
|
|-align=center
|October 14
|UFC 64: Unstoppable
|
| Las Vegas, Nevada, USA
|10,173
|300,000
|
|-align=center
|October 21
|Pride 32: The Real Deal
|
| Las Vegas, Nevada, USA
|11,727
|40,000
|
|-align=center
|November 2
|IFL: World Championship Semifinals
|
| Portland, Oregon, USA
|
|
|
|-align=center
|November 5
|Pride Bushido 13
|Pride Bushido Survival Finals
| Yokohama, Japan
|
|
|
|-align=center
|November 11
|The Ultimate Fighter 4 Finale
|
| Las Vegas, Nevada, USA
|
|
|
|-align=center
|November 11
|K-1 Hero's Lithuania 2006
|
| Lithuania
|
|
|
|-align=center
|November 18
|UFC 65: Bad Intentions
|
| Sacramento, California, USA
|14,666
|500,000
|
|-align=center
|December 8
|Strikeforce: Triple Threat
|
| San Jose, California, USA
|8,701
|
|
|-align=center
|December 13
|UFC Fight Night: Sanchez vs Riggs
|UFC Fight Night 7
| San Diego, California, USA
|
|
|
|-align=center
|December 29
|IFL: Championship Final
|
| Uncasville, Connecticut, USA
|
|
|
|-align=center
|December 30
|UFC 66: Liddell vs. Ortiz 2
|
| Paradise, Nevada, USA
|13,761
|1,050,000
|
|-align=center
|December 31
|Pride Shockwave 2006
|
| Saitama, Japan
|48,709
|
|
|-align=center
|December 31
|K-1 PREMIUM 2006 Dynamite!!
|
| Osaka, Japan
|51,930
|
|
|-align=center

Motorsport

Radiosport
 13th Amateur Radio Direction Finding World Championship held in Primorsko, Bulgaria.

Rugby league

 February 3 at Galpharm Stadium, Huddersfield – 2006 World Club Challenge match is won by the Bradford Bulls 30–10 over the Wests Tigers before 19,207
 March 18 at Canberra Stadium, Canberra – record for most points scored in Australian premiership history is broken with 102 scored in the Newcastle Knights' 70–32 win over the Canberra Raiders
 May 5 at Suncorp Stadium, Brisbane – 2006 ANZAC Day Test is won by Australia 50–12 against New Zealand before 44,191
 July 5 at Telstra Dome, Melbourne – 2006 State of Origin is won by Queensland in the third and deciding match against New South Wales 16–14 before 54,833
 August 26 at Twickenham Stadium, London – 2006 Challenge Cup tournament culminates in St Helens R.F.C.'s 42–12 win over Huddersfield Giants in the final before 65,187
 October 1 at Telstra Stadium, Sydney – 2006 NRL premiership culminates in the Brisbane Broncos' 15–8 win over the Melbourne Storm in the Grand Final before 79,609
 October 14 at Old Trafford, Manchester – Super League XI culminates in St Helens R.F.C.'s 26–4 win over Hull F.C. in the Grand Final before 72,582
 November 25 at Aussie Stadium, Sydney – 2006 Tri-nations tournament culminates in Australia's 16–12 win over New Zealand in the final before 27,325

Rugby union
 112th Six Nations Championship series is won by France
 Sale Sharks win the Guinness Premiership
 London Wasps win the 2005-06 Powergen Cup
 Biarritz win the Top 14
 Ulster win the Celtic League
 Munster win the 2005-06 Heineken Cup
 The Crusaders win the Super 14 final in foggy conditions.
 The All Blacks win the 2006 Tri Nations Series
 The Blue Bulls and the Free State Cheetahs share the Currie Cup in Bloemfontein after the final went into extra time and was drawn 28–28

Ski jumping
 Four Hills Tournament – Janne Ahonen and Jakub Janda are joint winners, the first time in the tournament's 54-year history that it has been shared

Ski mountaineering
 February–March – 2006 World Championship of Ski Mountaineering held in the Province of Cuneo in Italy

Speed skating
 European Championships held at Hamar, Norway
 Men's all-round: Enrico Fabris (Italy) with 151.523 points
 Ladies' all-round: Claudia Pechstein (Germany) with 163.159 points
 World Sprint Championships held at Heerenveen, Netherlands
 Men: Joey Cheek (USA) with 139.990 points
 Ladies: Svetlana Zhurova (Russia) with 153.625 points
 World Allround Championships held at Calgary, Alberta, Canada
 Men: Shani Davis (USA) with 145.742 points
 Ladies: Cindy Klassen (Canada) with 154.580 points

Swimming
 8th World Short Course Championships held in Shanghai
 Australia wins the most medals (24) and the most gold medals (12)
 28th European LC Championships held in Budapest
 Italy and France win the most medals (15); Russia the most gold medals (7)
 August 12 – Roland Schoeman breaks the short course world record in the men's 50m freestyle (short course) at Hamburg with a time of 20:98 seconds.
 August 28 – at Hobart, Tasmania, Australian swimmer Libby Lenton betters Natalie Coughlin's world record in the women's 100m butterfly (short course) from 56:39 to 55:95

Tennis
 Australian Open
 Men's Final: Roger Federer (Switzerland) defeats Marcos Baghdatis (Cyprus)
 Women's Final: Amélie Mauresmo (France) defeats Justine Henin-Hardenne (Belgium)
 French Open
 Men's Final: Rafael Nadal (Spain) defeats Roger Federer (Switzerland)
 Women's Final: Justine Henin-Hardenne (Belgium) defeats Svetlana Kuznetsova (Russia)
 Wimbledon Championships
 Men's Final: Roger Federer (Switzerland) defeats Rafael Nadal (Spain)
 Women's Final: Amélie Mauresmo (France) defeats Justine Henin-Hardenne (Belgium)
 US Open
 Men's Final: Roger Federer (Switzerland) defeats Andy Roddick (USA)
 Women's Final: Maria Sharapova (Russia) defeats Justine Henin-Hardenne (Belgium)

Triathlon
 ITU World Championships held in Lausanne, Switzerland

Volleyball
 Men's World League: Brazil
 2006 Men's European Volleyball League: Netherlands
 2006 FIVB Men's World Championship: Brazil
 Women's World Grand Prix: Brazil
 2006 FIVB Women's World Championship: Russia

Water polo
 2006 FINA Men's Water Polo World Cup: Serbia
 2006 FINA Men's Water Polo World League: Serbia
 2006 Men's European Water Polo Championship: Serbia
 2006 Women's European Water Polo Championship: Russia
 2006 FINA Women's Water Polo World League: USA

Weightlifting
 2006 World Weightlifting Championships in Santo Domingo, Dominican Republic

World University Championships
2006 World University Championships

Multi-sport events
 Central American and Caribbean Games held in Cartagena de Indias, Colombia
 2006 Lusophony Games held in Macau, People's Republic of China.
 2006 Commonwealth Games held in Melbourne, Australia
 2006 Asian Games held in Doha, Qatar
 2006 Winter Olympics in Turin, Italy from February 10, 2006, through February 26, 2006.
 2006 Gay Games held in Chicago, United States from July 15 to July 22, 2006.

Awards
 Associated Press Male Athlete of the Year – Tiger Woods, PGA golf
 Associated Press Female Athlete of the Year – Lorena Ochoa, LPGA golf

References

 
Sports by year